Unione Calcio Sampdoria, commonly referred to as Sampdoria, is an Italian professional football club based in Genoa.

The club was formed in 1946 from the merger of two existing sports clubs whose roots can be traced back to the 1890s, Sampierdarenese and Andrea Doria. Both the team name and colours reflect this union, the first being a combination of the names, the second taking the form of a unique kit design, predominantly blue (for Andrea Doria) with white, red and black bands (for Sampierdarenese) across the centre of the shirt, hence the nickname blucerchiati ("blue-circled").

Sampdoria play at Stadio Luigi Ferraris, capacity 36,536, which it shares with Genoa's other club, Genoa Cricket and Football Club. The fierce rivalry between the two teams is commonly known as the Derby della Lanterna, and has been contested in Serie A for most of its history.

Sampdoria have won the Scudetto once in their history, in 1991. The club has also won the Coppa Italia four times, in 1985, 1988, 1989 and 1994, and the Supercoppa Italiana once, in 1991. Their biggest European success came when they won the Cup Winners' Cup in 1990. They also reached the European Cup final in 1992, losing the final 1–0 to Barcelona after extra-time.

History

Sampierdarenese and Andrea Doria (1891–1927)
Ginnastica Sampierdarenese was founded in 1891, opening its football section in 1899. Named to honour Andrea Doria, a club named Società Andrea Doria was founded in 1895, which increasingly focused itself on football training and competition.

Andrea Doria did not participate in the first Italian Football Championship which was organised by the Italian Federation of Football (FIF) since instead they had enrolled themselves into a football tournament which was organised by the Italian Federation of Ginnastica. The club eventually joined the competition for the 1903 Italian Football Championship, but did not win a game in the tournament until 1907, when they beat local rivals Genoa 3–1. It was not until 1910–11 that the club began to show promise. During that season's tournament, they finished above Juventus, Internazionale and Genoa in the Piedmont-Lombardy-Liguria section.

After World War I, Sampierdarenese finally began to compete in the Italian Championship, after they took the place of Bolzaneto's Associazione del Calcio Ligure a pre-war club of the province of Genoa (in turn, Ligure was the heir of Liguria Foot Ball Club, a team founded in 1897). Thus, Samp and Doria met in the championship for the first time; Doria won in first-leg game (4–1 and 1–1), and they also finished in second place after Genoa in the Ligurian Championship, qualifying for the National Round.

With the 1921–22 season, the Italian top league was split into two competitions; both of the clubs in Sampdoria's history were in separate competitions that year too. Sampierdarenese played in the FIGC-run competition, whereas Andrea Doria played in the CCI variation. Sampierdarenese won the Liguria section and then went on to the semi-finals, finishing top out of three clubs; this led them to the final against Novese. Both legs of the final ended in 0–0 draws, thus a repetition match was played in Cremona on 21 May 1922. Still intensely difficult to separate, the match went into extra-time with Novese eventually winning the tie (and the Championship) 2–1. However, Sampierdarenese recriminated for the referee's conduct.

After the league system in Italy was brought back into one item, Sampierdarenese remained stronger than Andrea Doria by qualifying for the league. By 1924–25, the clubs were competing against each other in the Northern League; Doria who finished one place above their rivals and won one match 2–1, while Sampierdarenese were victorious 2–0 in the other.

From La Dominante to Sampdoria (1927–1946)
At the end of the 1926–27 season, Sampierdarenese and Andrea Doria merged for the first time under the name La Dominante by fascist authorities.

Wearing green and black striped shirts, La Dominante Genova were admitted to the first ever season of Serie B, where they finished third, just missing out on promotion. The next season, under the name Foot Ball Club Liguria, they had a disastrous year, finishing bottom of the table and suffering relegation.

Because of this, both Sampierdarenese and Andrea Doria reverted to their previous names as separate clubs. Sampierdarenese were back in Serie B for the 1932–33 season and finished in the upper part. The following year, they were crowned champions and were promoted into Serie A for the first time. Andrea Doria, on the other hand, battled out the 1930s down in Serie C.

On 15 July 1937 Sampierdarenese absorbed Corniglianese and Rivarolese, with the club adopting the name Associazione Calcio Liguria. This saw them reach fifth place in Serie A in 1939. In the early 1940s, the club was relegated but bounced straight back up as Serie B champions in 1941.

After World War II, both Andrea Doria and Sampierdarenese (the name Liguria was abolished in 1945) were competing in Serie A, but in a reverse of pre-war situations, Andrea Doria were now the top club out of the two. However, on 12 August 1946, a merger occurred to create Unione Calcio Sampdoria. The first chairman of this new club was Piero Sanguineti, but the ambitious entrepreneur Amedeo Rissotto soon replaced him, while the first team coach during this period was a man from Florence named Giuseppe Galluzzi. To illustrate the clubs would be equally represented in the new, merged club, a new kit was designed featuring the blue shirts of Andrea Doria and the white, red and black midsection of Sampierdarenese. In the same month of the merger, the new club demanded they should share the Stadio Luigi Ferraris ground with Genoa. An agreement was reached, and the stadium began hosting Genoa's and Sampdoria's home matches.

Early years and the achievements in the Mantovani era (1946–1993)
For about thirty years the Genoese played constantly in Serie A, with mixed results, the best of which was in the 1960–1961 season, in which they obtained fourth place in the championship. In the 1965–1966 season Sampdoria finished sixteenth, relegating to Serie B for the first time in its history; however, the following year they won the second-tier championship and immediately returned to Serie A.

In 1979, the club, then playing Serie B, was acquired by oil businessman Paolo Mantovani (1930–1993), who invested in the team to bring Sampdoria to the top flight. In 1982, Sampdoria made their Serie A return and won their first Coppa Italia in 1985. In 1986, Yugoslav Vujadin Boškov was appointed as the new head coach. The club won their second Coppa Italia in 1988, being admitted to the 1988–89 UEFA Cup Winners' Cup, where they reached the final, losing 2–0 to Barcelona. A second consecutive triumph in the Coppa Italia gave Sampdoria a spot in the 1989–90 Cup Winners' Cup, which they won after defeating Anderlecht after extra time in the final.

This was followed only one year later by their first and only Scudetto, being crowned as Serie A champions with a five-point advantage over second-placed Internazionale. The winning team featured several notable players, such as Gianluca Pagliuca, Gianluca Vialli, Roberto Mancini, Toninho Cerezo, Pietro Vierchowod and Attilio Lombardo, with Boškov as head coach. In the following season, Sampdoria reached the European Cup final and were defeated once again by Barcelona, at Wembley Stadium.

Vujadin Boškov is recognised as one of Sampdoria's most successful managers winning a record amount of trophies and thus further establishing the club's reputation in Europe.

Decline and resurgence (1993–present)
On 14 October 1993, Paolo Mantovani died suddenly and was replaced by his son Enrico. During his first season (1993–94), Sampdoria won one more Coppa Italia and placed third in Serie A. During the following four seasons, many players from his father's tenure left the club but many important acquisitions were made which kept Sampdoria in the top tier Serie A. This included the likes of Argentine internationals Juan Sebastián Verón and Ariel Ortega, and international midfielders Clarence Seedorf and Christian Karembeu. In April 1995 Sampdoria reached the semi-final stage of the Cup Winners' Cup, losing out to Arsenal on penalties after two legs.

In May 1999 Sampdoria were relegated from Serie A and did not return to the top flight until 2003. During this time, Sampdoria was acquired by Riccardo Garrone, an Italian oil businessman. Sampdoria returned to Serie A in 2003 led by talisman Francesco Flachi, and ended their first season in eighth place. After several more top-half finishes, manager Walter Novellino gave way to Walter Mazzarri in 2007.

With the signings of forwards Antonio Cassano from Real Madrid, and Giampaolo Pazzini in January 2008, Sampdoria ended the 2007–08 season in sixth position and qualified for the 2008–09 UEFA Cup. The following season, they came fourth and qualified for the UEFA Champions League play-offs under manager Luigi Delneri, who left for Juventus. With the departures also of CEO Giuseppe Marotta, and both Cassano and Pazzini, and the squad being stretched by Champions League football, Sampdoria were relegated to Serie B after a 2–1 loss at home to Palermo in May 2011. In the following season June 2012, Sampdoria won promotion back to Serie A after defeating Varese 4–2 on aggregate in the play-off final.

Following the death of Riccardo Garrone the previous year, the club was purchased from the Garrone family in June 2014 by the film producer Massimo Ferrero. After sixth-placed rivals Genoa in the 2014–15 season failed to obtain a UEFA license for the 2015–16 UEFA Europa League, seventh-placed Sampdoria took their spot. The club built a solid foundation in Serie A for the next seven years. Notable managerial appointments were Marco Giampaolo and Claudio Ranieri, as well as the steady flow of goals from talismanic striker Fabio Quagliarella.  Growing tensions however surrounded Ferrero's presidency, fuelled by his well-known and public support of A.S. Roma. Several attempts were made to sell the club, including to a consortium led by club legend Gianluca Vialli. On 6 December 2021 Massimo Ferrero was arrested by Italian police as part of ongoing investigations into corporate crimes and bankruptcy. He resigned from his position as President of Sampdoria with immediate effect, whilst a club statement assured fans that the affairs of the football club were not a part of the investigations. On 27 December, former player Marco Lanna was appointed President. In January 2022 the club welcomed back former manager Marco Giampaolo after a disappointing start to the season under Roberto D'Aversa. On 6 February in his first home game back in charge Sampdoria defeated Sassuolo 4-0. Results however began to dwindle, and after eight games and a winless start to the 2022–23 season the club parted company with Giampaolo. On 6 October former Serie A player legend Dejan Stanković was appointed to the role with the task of steering the club clear of the relegation zone.

Players

Current squad
.

Out on loan
.

Club staff

Managerial history

Colours, badge and nicknames
The club crest features a sailor in profile known by the old Genoese name of Baciccia, which translates to Giovanni Battista in Italian or John-Baptist in English. The image of a sailor is appropriate due to Sampdoria being based in the port city of Genoa. The precise design of the Baciccia came from a Disney-licensed and Panini-published comic, Topolino, in 1980. Since 1980, the Baciccia has appeared on the shirts of Sampdoria, mostly on the chest but occasionally on the sleeve.

The white, blue, red and black colours represent the club's origins with a merger between two teams, Sampierdarenese and Andrea Doria, who wore respectively red/black and white/blue jerseys with a shield with Saint-George cross.

Supporters and rivalries

Sampdoria supporters come mainly from the city of Genoa. The biggest group are Ultras Tito Cucchiaroni, named after an Argentinian left winger who played for Sampdoria. The group were founded in 1969, making it one of the oldest ultra groups in Italy. They are apolitical, although there are smaller groups like Rude Boys Sampdoria, who are left-wing. The main support with flags and flares comes from the southern Curva, Gradinata Sud.

Sampdoria's biggest rivals are Genoa, against whom they play the Derby della Lanterna.

Recent seasons

The recent season-by-season performance of the club:

Key

Honours

Domestic
Serie A
Winners (1): 1990–91

Coppa Italia
Winners (4): 1984–85, 1987–88, 1988–89, 1993–94
Runners-up (3): 1985–86, 1990–91, 2008–09

Supercoppa Italiana
Winners (1): 1991
Runners-up (3): 1988, 1989, 1994

Serie B
Winners (1): 1966–67
Runners-up (1): 2002–03

European

European Cup
Runners-up (1): 1991–92

European Cup Winners' Cup
Winners (1): 1989–90
Runners-up (1): 1988–89

European Super Cup
Runners-up (1): 1990

Friendly
Wembley International Tournament
Winners (3): 1990, 1991, 1992
Amsterdam Tournament
Winners (1): 1988
Joan Gamper Trophy
 Winners (1): 2012

Divisional movements

World Cup winners
  Alain Boghossian (France 1998)
  Shkodran Mustafi (Brazil 2014)

References

External links

Sampdoria's official website 
UC Sampdoria at Serie A 
UC Sampdoria at UEFA.com
Sampdoria statistics
The story told through UC Sampdoria collectables

 
1946 establishments in Italy
Association football clubs established in 1946
Coppa Italia winning clubs
Football clubs in Italy
Football clubs in Genoa
Serie A winning clubs
Serie A clubs
Serie B clubs
Serie C clubs
UEFA Cup Winners' Cup winning clubs